David Gray (28 March 1953 - 2 April 2009) was a former Scotland international rugby union player.

Rugby Union career

Amateur career

He played rugby at Kilmarnock Academy before playing for Kilmarnock.

He then played for West of Scotland.

Provincial career

He played for Ayrshire.

He played for Glasgow District. He was part of the Glasgow side that shared the 1974–75 Scottish Inter-District Championship with North and Midlands.

International career

He was capped by Scotland 'B' once, in 1978, against Italy 'B'.

He went on to receive 9 full senior caps for Scotland.

Civil Service career

He was a planner with South Ayrshire Council. One of his remits was mapping and opening up pathways; to ensure that the public had access to the countryside.

Death

Gray enjoyed pushing his body; and he completed the 205 mile Great Outdoors trek from Knoydart to the East Coast of Scotland in 2008. He was completing a training run at Dam Park, Ayr for the 2009 event when he died just as he was crossing the finish line. It was believed he suffered a massive heart attack.

References

1953 births
2009 deaths
Glasgow District (rugby union) players
Kilmarnock RFC players
Rugby union players from Kilmarnock
Scotland 'B' international rugby union players
Scotland international rugby union players
Scottish rugby union players
West of Scotland FC players
Rugby union locks